Doorada Betta is a 1973 Kannada-language film directed by Siddalingaiah. The film starred Rajkumar and Bharathi Vishnuvardhan. It had Balakrishna, K. S. Ashwath and Sampath playing supporting roles. The film, along with Mooruvare Vajragalu (1973), was Rajkumar's last movie in black-and-white. However, this movie had few sequences shot in colour.This was also the last film where Rajkumar and Bharathi were seen together. This was also Rajkumar's last collaboration with Siddalingaiah. The film is seen as a landmark in the career of Siddalingaiah. The movie saw a theatrical run of 25 weeks.

Cast

 Rajkumar as Shiva
 Bharathi Vishnuvardhan as Gowri
 Balakrishna
 K. S. Ashwath
 Sampath
 M. P. Shankar
 Dwarakish
 Chi. Udayashankar
 Loknath
 Leelavathi
 Bangalore Nagesh
 Joker Shyam
 H. R. Shastry
 Sathyan
 Kannada Raju
 Comedian Guggu
 Shani Mahadevappa
 Y. R. Ashwath Narayan
 Chaluvali Narayan
 Papamma as Bhadrakali
 Ramadevi
 Jorge Indira
 Basavaraj (credited as Master Basavaraj)
 Usha Chauhan

Soundtrack
Music for the film and its soundtrack was composed by G. K. Venkatesh, with lyrics for the soundtrack written by Chi. Udaya Shankar. The soundtrack album includes tracks from P. Susheela, P. B. Sreenivas, A. Mothi and Asha Bhosle.

References

External links
 

1973 films
1970s Kannada-language films
Films scored by G. K. Venkatesh
Films directed by Siddalingaiah
Indian black-and-white films